Béni Tamou is a town and commune in Blida Province, Algeria. According to the 2008 census it has a population of 33,846.

References

Communes of Blida Province